Michael Kubíček (born January 12, 1967) is a Czech former professional ice hockey defenceman.

Kubíček played in the Czechoslovak First Ice Hockey League and the Czech Extraliga for HC České Budějovice, playing 234 games for the team over seven seasons. He also three seasons in the Élite Ligue in France for Brûleurs de Loups and LHC Les Lions.

References

External links

1967 births
Living people
Adendorfer EC players
EHC Bayreuth players
Brûleurs de Loups players
Motor České Budějovice players
Czech ice hockey defencemen
LHC Les Lions players
People from Tábor
HC Tábor players
Sportspeople from the South Bohemian Region
Czechoslovak ice hockey defencemen
HC Dukla Jihlava players
Czech expatriate ice hockey players in Germany
Czech expatriate sportspeople in France
Czech expatriate sportspeople in Austria
Expatriate ice hockey players in Austria
Expatriate ice hockey players in France